Christopher Elliott Winn (13 November 1926 – 27 August 2017) was an English rugby union player and cricketer. He played international rugby for England and first-class cricket for Sussex and Oxford University.
He died in a nursing home from pancreatic cancer on 27 August 2017.

Rugby
Winn played eight rugby union Tests for England between 1952 and 1954 as a winger, scoring three tries. He won a Blue for Oxford University and after university played for Rosslyn Park, where he was later President.

Cricket
He appeared in 59 first-class matches as a left-handed batsman who sometimes kept wicket. He scored 2,449 runs with a highest score of 146 not out, one of two centuries, and completed 40 catches with one stumping.

References

External links
 
 
 

1926 births
2017 deaths
Deaths from pancreatic cancer
Alumni of Exeter College, Oxford
English cricketers
Free Foresters cricketers
Marylebone Cricket Club cricketers
Oxford University cricketers
Sussex cricketers
English rugby union players
England international rugby union players
Barbarian F.C. players
Oxford University RFC players
Rosslyn Park F.C. players
D. R. Jardine's XI cricketers
Rugby union players from Beckenham
Cricketers from Beckenham
Rugby union wings